Castle Hill is a knoll located in Cambridge, England, located in the Castle ward of the city. Cambridgeshire County Council's former headquarters, Shire Hall, are located directly adjacent to Castle Hill.

History

The hill is the site of the original settlement, north of the River Cam. There is evidence of pre-Roman activity, but the Romans created a town called Duroliponte here. It was a convenient place to cross the river. At the time it was at the head of the navigable part of the river, then known as the River Granta.  St Peter's Church, located halfway up the hill, has some pieces of Roman tile in its walls.

In the Anglo Saxon period, the hill was used for defence. In 1068, the Normans built Cambridge Castle on the hill. The castle is no longer extant; only Castle Mound remains.

Castle Hill is also near Shire Hall.

See also
 Castle Street, southwest of Castle Hill
 Honey Hill, also to the southwest

References

Parks and open spaces in Cambridge
History of Cambridge
Hills of Cambridgeshire